Defending champion Stefan Olsson defeated Gustavo Fernández in the final, 6–2, 0–6, 6–3 to win the gentlemen's singles wheelchair tennis title at the 2018 Wimbledon Championships.

Seeds

 Shingo Kunieda (quarterfinals)
 Alfie Hewett (semifinals)

Draw

Finals

References
WC Men's Singles

Men's Wheelchair Singles
Wimbledon Championship by year – Wheelchair men's singles